"Ultima Lucha Tres" (Spanish for Last Fight Three) is the name of the final episodes of the third season of professional wrestling TV series Lucha Underground. The first part of Ultima Lucha Tres (episode 37) premiered on the El Rey Network on September 27, 2017. The second part (episode 38) was shown on October 4, The third part (episode 39) was shown on October 11 and the fourth part (and Season 3 finale) was broadcast October 18 on the El Rey Network and later shown in Mexico with Spanish commentary on the UniMás network. The episodes are the climax of several ongoing storylines that played out throughout the third season of Lucha Underground. As part of the season finale all three of the Lucha Underground championships were on the line. The episodes were taped on June 25 and 26, 2016.

Event
For all four parts of Ultima Lucha Tres the commentators were Matt Striker and Vampiro, and the ring announcer was Melissa Santos.

Results

Part 1

Part 2

Part 3

Part 4

References

External links
 Official website

2017 in professional wrestling
Professional wrestling in Los Angeles
2017 in California
Lucha Underground shows
Events in Los Angeles